Middlebrook 7H9 broth is a liquid growth medium specially used for culture of Mycobacterium species, notably Mycobacterium tuberculosis.

Composition
 Ammonium sulfate
 L-Glutamic acid
 Sodium citrate
 Pyridoxine
 Biotin
 Disodium phosphate
 Monopotassium phosphate
 Ferric ammonium citrate
 Magnesium sulfate
 Calcium chloride
 Zinc sulfate
 Copper Sulfate

Middlebrook 7H9 broth supports the growth of mycobacterial species when supplemented with nutrients such as glycerol, oleic acid, albumin, and dextrose, except for Mycobacterium bovis, which is inhibited by glycerol. Cultures should be read within 5–7 days after inoculation and once a week thereafter for up to 8 weeks.

Middlebrook broth is commonly used in the preparation of inocula for antimicrobial assays, biochemical tests (arylsufatase and tellurite reduction), and maintenance of stock strains.

Additionally, 7H9 broth is used as a medium in the mycobacteria growth indicator tube.

See also
 Lowenstein-Jensen medium
 Middlebrook 7H10 agar

References

External links
 Middlebrook 7H9 Broths

Microbiological media